Radio Free America is the debut studio album released by RSO, a duo featuring Bon Jovi ex-guitarist Richie Sambora and Australian guitarist Orianthi. The album was released May 11, 2018.

Recording and production
Orianthi and Sambora recorded the album over two years, mostly in their Los Angeles home. The album was produced by Bob Rock (Mötley Crüe, Metallica, Bon Jovi). Sambora and Orianthi explore a wide variety of genres on the album, including rock, blues, pop, R&B and country. The album gathers together all of the duo's previously-released singles and the 2017 EPs, Rise and Making History, along with more new tracks.

The duo originally released the single "Masterpiece", which premiered on Billboard on September 28, 2017 and in December 2017 they released "Walk With Me" and the holiday single "One Night of Peace".

In February 2018, Sambora and Orianthi released dual singles for Valentine's Day putting their own spin on the Sonny & Cher song "I Got You Babe", and they also debuted a brand new RSO original "Forever All the Way".

Track listing

Personnel
 Richie Sambora – lead vocals, electric and acoustic guitars, talkbox, bass, keyboards, percussion
 Orianthi – lead vocals, background vocals, electric and acoustic guitars, bass (track 3), production (track 14)

Charts
Album chart usages for Scotland

References

2018 debut albums
Albums produced by Bob Rock
Orianthi albums
Richie Sambora albums